Susan Gilbert is an American author, publisher, entrepreneur and consultant. Susan is known for her unique marketing campaign and strategy for coffee shops in 1990's. She was called for an interview by CNBC for investing in the coffee bars in the South Korea investment program. Susan has won Writer's Digest Award for Inspirational Category in 2002.

Career
In 1987, Susan opened a coffee bar in the city of San Diego and by the end of decade she owned five coffee shops. She begin writing in 2001 and authored a book, The Land of I Can which became popular in all age groups. Susan saw an early success when she won Writer's Digest Award Winner, Inspirational Category in 2002 and was interviewed with San Diego Union Tribune, Nwitimes, Prevention Magazine, USA Weekend, Inc Magazine, The Times, Friendly Exchange and other news media companies. After that she was called by Linda Formichelli and W. Eric Martin to co-author The Complete Idiot's Guide to Starting and Running a Coffee Bar with them and it was published in 2004. Susan Gilbert started a consultancy company Online Promotion Success, Inc. headquartered at Issaquah, Washington to help businesses in brand building and promoting them online. Later she introduced a series of inspirational products, called You Can! products. In June 2013, she published a book ''Klout Score: Social Media Influence".

Bibliography

References

External links
 Official Website
 Facebook

Date of birth missing (living people)
Year of birth missing (living people)
Living people
American consultants
American publishers (people)
American women writers
21st-century American women